The 10th edition of World Para Ice Hockey Championships (originally named IPC Ice Sledge Hockey World Championships) was held in 2019. The championships were divided into three tournaments.

The main event (Tournament A) was hosted by Ostrava, Czech Republic The first matches were played on April 27 and the championships concluded with the final game played on May 4. It was the second time Ostrava World Para Ice Hockey Championships, as Ostrava hosted the Championships 10 years ago in 2009. The tournament achieved record number of spectators, as their total number reached 65,000. It also broke record for single game as the semifinal of hosting team against United States and bronze medal match against South Korea saw 8,600 spectator each, both surpassing the record from 2002 Winter Paralympics in Salt Lake City.

Tournament B was held in Berlin, Germany from November 17 to 22.

Tournament C was held in Vierumäki, Finland, from November 6 to 8, 2018, with three teams competing: Australia, China, and Finland.

Format
In Tournament A the contestants were divided into two groups based on their ranking. The top two teams from Group A advanced directly into semi-finals while the remaining two teams together with the best two teams from Group B advanced to quarter-finals. Remaining two teams from Group B were relegated to B-Pool for the following championships.

Tournament B was played in a round-robin where every team played a match with every other team. The top two teams then advanced to A-Pool for championships in 2021 while the last team was relegated to 2020 C-Pool.

Tournament A

Venue

Preliminary round
All times are local (UTC+2).

Group A

Group B

Playoff round

Source: IPC

Seventh place match

Quarterfinals

Fifth place match

Semifinals

Bronze medal match

Final

Final ranking and statistics

Final ranking

Pos = Final position; Grp = Group
Source: IPC

Scoring leaders
List shows the top skaters sorted by points, then goals, then by fewest games played.

Gen = Gender; GP = Games played; G = Goals; A = Assists; Pts = Points; +/− = Plus/minus; PIM = Penalties in minutes; Pos = Position
Source: IPC

Goaltending leaders
Only the top five goaltenders, based on save percentage, who have played at least 40% of their team's minutes, are included in this list.

Gen = Gender; MiP = Minutes and seconds played; SOG = Shots on goal; GA = Goals against; GAA = Goals against average per 45 minutes; Sv% = Save percentage; SO = Shutouts
Source: IPC

Awards
Best players selected by the directorate:
Best Goaltender:  Dominic Larocque
Best Defenceman:  Liam Hickey
Best Forward:  Declan Farmer
Source: IPC

Media All-Star:  Michal Geier
Source: IPC

Team rosters

Canada
 Goalies:  Corbin Watson, Dominic Larocque
 Defencemen: Rodney Crane, Tyrone Henry, Rob Armstrong, Kevin Sorley, Liam Hickey, James Gemmell
 Forwards: James Dunn, Zach Lavin, Tyler McGregor, Corbyn Smith, Greg Westlake, Billy Bridges, Dominic Cozzolino, Garrett Riley, Antoine Lehoux
Source:

Czech Republic
 Goalies:  Martin Kudela, Michal Vápenka
 Defencemen: Tomáš Kvoch, Pavel Kubeš, Miroslav Hrbek, Pavel Doležal
 Forwards: Karel Wágner, Miroslav Novotný, Zdeněk Šafránek, Zdeněk Klíma, Lukáš Kořínek, Michal Geier, Jiří Raul, David Palát, Zdeněk Hábl, Zdeněk Krupička
Source:

Italy
 Goalies:  Santino Stillitano, Gabriele Araudo
 Defencemen: Gian Luca Cavaliere, Roberto Radice, Andrea Macri, Emanuele Parolin, Alex Enderle, Julian Kasslatter, Stefan Kerschbaumer
 Forwards: Florian Planker, Sandro Kalegaris, Stephan Kafmann, Nils Larch, Francesco Torella, Alessandro Andreoni, Gabriele Lanza, Christoph Depaoli
Source:

Japan
 Goalies:  Shinobu Fukushima, Atsuya Hoshiro
 Defencemen: Satoru Sudo, Eiji Misawa, Hideaki Ishii, Masaharu Kumagai
 Forwards: Kazuyoshi Niitsu, Masaya Hamamoto, Mamoru Yokishawa, Yoshihito Sakamoto, Taimei Shiba, Yoshihiro Shioya, Nao Kodama
Source:

Norway
 Goalies:  Johan Grønlie, Erik Haugen
 Defencemen: Rolf Einar Pedersen, Knut Andre Nordstoga, Martin Hamre, Audun Bakke, Andreas Sundt
 Forwards: Emil Kirstistuen, Morten Værnes, Tor Joakim Rivera, Magnus Bogle, Loyd Remi Pallander Solberg, Lena Schrøder, Martin Grøsfjeld, Ola Oiseth, Torstein Aanekre
Source:

South Korea
 Goalies:  Yu Man-gyun, Lee Jae-woong
 Defencemen: Choi Kwang-hyouk, Cho Young-jae, Kim Young-sung, Jang Dong-shin, Choi Si-woo
 Forwards: Lee Jun-yong, Ryu Jee-hyun, Jung Seung-hwan, Lee Ju-seung, Kim In-kyum, Kim Dea-jung, Cho Byeong-seok, Lee Jong-kyung, Kim Sang-lak, Jang Jong-ho
Source:

Sweden
 Goalies:  Ulf Nilsson, Andreas Nejman
 Defencemen: Niklas Ingvarsson, Peter Nilsson, Staffan Siren
 Forwards: Johnny Pettersson, Christian Hedberg, Daniel Cederstam, Niklas Rakos, Maximilian Dickson Gyllsten
Source:

United States
 Goalies:  Jen Lee, Steve Cash
 Defencemen: Ralph DeQuebec, Colin Gooley, Jack Wallace, Christopher Douglas, Josh Pauls
 Forwards: Brody Roybal, Travis Dodson, Luke McDermott, Kyle Zych, Declan Farmer, Noah Grove, Rico Roman, Josh Hargis, Kevin McKee
Source:

Tournament B

Venue
All the matches were played in Berlin P09 Eissporthalle.

Results

Team rosters

China
Bai Xue Song, Che Hang, Cui Yu Tao, Guo Xi Zhu, Hu Guang Jian, Ji Yan Zhao, Li Zhen Yang, Qiu Dian Peng, Shen Yi Feng, Song Xiao Dong, Tian Jin Tao, Wang Ju Jiang, Wang Wei, Wang Zhi Dong, Xu Jin Qiang, Zhang Zheng, Zhu Zhan Fu

Germany
Finn Bentzen, Klaus Brzoska, Bas Disveld, Bernhard Hering, Christian Jaster, Nils Krueger, Ingo Kuhli-Lauenstein, Simon Kunst, Veit Mühlhans, Robert Pabst, Christian Pilz, Hugo Raedler, Felix Schrader, Lucas Sklorz, Joerg Wedde, Jacob Wolff

Great Britain
Anthony Booth, Tyler Christopher, Matt Clarkson, Mark Colquitt, Bryan Hackworth, Dean Lahan, Jonathon Le Galloudec, Karl Nicholson, Martin Quinn, Scott Trigg-Turner, Matt Woollias

Poland
Łukasz Ciuła, Radosław Drapała, Sylwester Flis, Marcin Hebda, Sebastian Kartosz, Andrzej Młynarczyk, Mateusz Murawski, Krzysztof Sekulski, Mariusz Zieliński

Russia
Aleksei Eremin, Dmitrii Galkin, Vladimir Kamantsev, Airat Khamzin, Maksim Kuzminykh, Ivan Kuznetsov, Dmitrii Lisov, Igor Maletskiy, Mikhail Miachin, Evgenii Petrov, Evgenii Plotnikov, Roman Severin, Konstantin Shikhov, Andrey Sokolov, Nikolai Terentev, Vasilii Varlakov, Ilia Volkov

Slovakia
Slavomir Ferenčík, Erik Fojtík, Martin Joppa, Miroslav Kardoš, Peter Kaščák, Dávid Korman, Eduard Lepáček, Marián Ligda, Miroslav Pastucha, Miroslav Stašák, Peter Štít, Róbert Turic, Miloš Večerek

Tournament C

Venue
All the matches were held in Vierumäki Sport Institute.

Results

References

External links 
 
 Results book – A-Pool
 Results book – B-Pool
 Results book – C-Pool

World Para Ice Hockey Championships - Men's
World Para Ice Hockey Championships
Sport in Ostrava
International ice hockey competitions hosted by the Czech Republic
sled
May 2019 sports events in Europe
April 2019 sports events in Europe